Consuelo Piedad Flores Carrera (born November 28, 1962) is an Ecuadorian lawyer and politician. She was a member of the National Assembly from 2009 to 2013, and has been a member of the  since 2014.

Biography
Consuelo Flores was born in Guayaquil on November 28, 1962. She completed her higher education at the University of Guayaquil, where she obtained a teaching degree, and at the Metropolitan University, where she obtained a law degree. Later she served as leader of the taxi drivers' union.

She retained her seat after the 2019 sectional elections.

References

External links
 

1962 births
Living people
Members of the National Assembly (Ecuador)
People from Guayaquil
Social Christian Party (Ecuador) politicians
University of Guayaquil alumni
21st-century Ecuadorian women politicians
21st-century Ecuadorian politicians
Women members of the National Assembly (Ecuador)